Number 1 Angel is the third mixtape by English singer and songwriter Charli XCX, released on 10 March 2017 by Asylum Records. The mixtape contains ten tracks and was created in Los Angeles as a collaboration with producer A. G. Cook, the founder of PC Music. Several other producers associated with the label also contributed to the mixtape, including Sophie who previously produced Charli XCX's extended play Vroom Vroom. Musically, it has been labeled as avant-pop and electropop.

Background
In January 2017, Charli XCX stated in an interview with Rolling Stone that she was planning to release a mixtape before the release of her third album saying: "I just got bored and made a load of songs, so I decided to put them out." In another interview, with 93.3, she told the radio station that she recorded the mixtape in two weeks. She described it by saying, "this is more like crying into the champagne than drinking it", and compared it to her work with Sophie. The mixtape was slated for a February 2017 release but was pushed back due to label conflicts. Charli XCX initially recorded the mixtape without her label's permission, stating that the situation, along with the album delay, had her feeling "frustrated and annoyed".

Critical reception

At Metacritic, which assigns a normalised rating out of 100 to reviews from mainstream critics, Number 1 Angel received an average score of 73, based on 5 reviews, indicating generally favorable reviews. Frank Falisi from Tiny Mix Tapes compared the mixtape to Madonna's early works and described it as "a text for mitigating engagements." At Pretty Much Amazing, Mick Jacobs stated that "Aitchison intelligently pairs her clever lyrics against beats that push genres outward, her filling in the spaces with her hooks and gigantic personality," whilst Katherine St. Asaph of Pitchfork wrote that the mixtape "is largely stolen by its guests, like Uffie and Cupcakke."

Retrospectively, in April 2022, Clash's Ana Lamond stated that the mixtape "holds a resilience in its stride, drawing none of its attention to the cries from Sucker Charli XCX fans, pleading for a to return to the more commercial, the more conventional breakthrough days. By no means does the mixtape play things safe, making for a bold attempt in re-defining pop music with its embrace for PC Music."

Accolades

Track listing

Personnel
Credits adapted from Tidal.

Musicians

 Charli XCX – lead vocals
 A. G. Cook – programming , synthesizer , piano 
 MØ – vocals 
 EasyFun – programming and synthesizer , piano 
 Sophie – programming 
 Danny L Harle – programming 
 MNDR – backing vocals 
 John Hill – programming 
 Jordan Orvash – keyboards 
 Life Sim – synthesizer 

Technical

 Stuart Hawkes – mastering engineer
 Geoff Swan – mixing
 Cameron Gower Poole – engineer 
 Alex Williams – engineer 
 Rob Cohen – engineer 
 Ryan Gilligan – engineer

Charts

Tour

Notes

References

2017 mixtape albums
Avant-pop albums
Asylum Records albums
Charli XCX albums
Albums produced by John Hill (record producer)
Albums produced by Sophie (musician)
Albums produced by A. G. Cook
Albums produced by Danny L Harle